Playground is an album by the Steve Kuhn/Sheila Jordan Band recorded in 1979 and released on the ECM label.

Reception 
The Allmusic review by Scott Yanow awarded the album 4½ stars calling it "Intriguing music".

Track listing
All compositions by Steve Kuhn

 "Tomorrow's Son" - 5:59
 "Gentle Thoughts" - 7:25
 "Poem For No. 15" - 7:09
 "The Zoo" - 4:36
 "Deep Tango" - 10:43
 "Life's Backward Glance" - 5:39

Personnel 
 Steve Kuhn - piano
 Sheila Jordan - voice
 Harvie Swartz - bass 
 Bob Moses - drums

References 

ECM Records albums
Steve Kuhn albums
Sheila Jordan albums
1980 albums
Albums recorded at CBS 30th Street Studio